Sobonfu Somé (d. January 14, 2017) was a Burkinabe teacher and writer, specializing in topics of spirituality. She wrote three books: her first, The Spirit of Intimacy, looks at relationships and intimacy through the lens of African spirituality and  teachings.

She founded the organization Wisdom Spring to teach African spirituality to westerners and to provide drinking water to villages in West Africa.

Naming 
Sobonfu Somé wrote about African culture, with a focus on her and her husband's interpretations of Dagara spiritual traditions for use by Westerners. One story she relayed was that, in a naming ceremony, her mother had been placed in a trance-like state in which she and the elders of the community divined Sobunfu's life purpose. She said the elders then gave her, the unborn child, the name Sobonfu, meaning "Keeper of Ritual", based upon this experience.

Marriage 
Sobonfu was married to Malidoma Patrice Somé in an arranged marriage. The couple moved to London, and later the United States.

Death 
Somé died from a weakened immune system attributed to water contamination.

Works
The Spirit of Intimacy: Ancient Teachings in the Ways of Relationships. New York, NY: Quill, 2002. 
Welcoming Spirit Home: Ancient African Teachings to Celebrate Children and Community. Novato, CA: New World Library. 
Falling Out of Grace: Meditations on Loss, Healing and Wisdom. El Sobrante, CA: North Bay Books. Arms, S. (2002). .
Women's Wisdom from the Heart of Africa. Louisville, CO: Sounds True, 2004.

References

Burkinabé women writers
2017 deaths
21st-century women writers
Year of birth missing
21st-century Burkinabé people